Michael Langley (died 14 July 2018) was a British snooker player. He won the gold medal at the 1988 Paralympics, making him the last person to win a Paralympic snooker gold medal. He also won a bronze medal in the paraplegic snooker event at the 1984 Summer Paralympics.

Langley was a supporter of Slough Town.

References

20th-century births
2018 deaths
Snooker players at the 1988 Summer Paralympics
Place of death missing
Place of birth missing
Year of birth missing
Paralympic snooker players of Great Britain
Paralympic medalists in snooker
Paralympic gold medalists for Great Britain
Paralympic bronze medalists for Great Britain
Medalists at the 1988 Summer Paralympics